Cosmos Dauda (born 31 August 1993) is a Ghanaian professional footballer who plays as a striker for Oman Club in Oman Professional League.

Club career
In July 2018, Dauda signed with Al-Faisaly in Jordan on a two-year deal. In July 2019, Dauda signed with Lebanese side Salam Zgharta but due to political disturbance in the country, all foreigners had to leave Lebanon immediately. During the 2020 winter transfer window, Dauda moved to Omani team Al-Rustaq on a 5-month contract for the 2019–20 season.

On 17 October 2020, Dauda moved to Saudi Arabian side Al-Thoqbah.

On 29 January 2021, Dauda came back to Oman and signed with Al-Rustaq for remainder of the 2020–21 season of Oman.

In October 2021, Dauda signed with Oman Club for 2021–22 season.

References

External links
 
 
 
 

1993 births
Living people
Ghanaian footballers
Association football forwards
Ghana Premier League players
Ghanaian expatriate footballers
Lebanese Premier League players
Salam Zgharta FC players
Al-Faisaly SC players
Al-Thoqbah Club players
Saudi First Division League players
Expatriate footballers in Jordan
Expatriate footballers in Lebanon
Expatriate footballers in Saudi Arabia
Expatriate footballers in Oman
Ghanaian expatriate sportspeople in Jordan
Ghanaian expatriate sportspeople in Lebanon
Ghanaian expatriate sportspeople in Oman
Ghanaian expatriate sportspeople in Saudi Arabia